Nicolás Moreno (born 14 January 1994) is an Argentine professional footballer who plays as a defender for Deportivo Español.

Career
Deportivo Español gave Moreno his start in first-team football. He made his senior bow in March 2015 against Deportivo Merlo in Primera B Metropolitana, which preceded a further thirteen appearances in the 2015 campaign. In the subsequent 2016 Primera B Metropolitana, Moreno scored his first goals after netting in May 2016 fixtures with Acassuso and Deportivo Riestra. In total, Moreno featured ninety times and scored five goals - alongside receiving five red cards - in five seasons with the club; which culminated with relegation to Primera C Metropolitana in 2018–19.

Career statistics
.

References

External links

1994 births
Living people
Sportspeople from Santa Fe Province
Argentine footballers
Association football defenders
Primera B Metropolitana players
Deportivo Español footballers